Power is the second studio album by South African singer-songwriter Amanda Black. It was released on 25 October 2019 through her new formed record label AfroRockstar in joint-venture with Sony Music Entertainment. The album boasts 18 tracks with music production credits from Christer, Gemini Major, Vuyo Manyike, Loud Haileer and more.

Power was nominated for Best Adult Contemporary Album at 2020 South African Music Awards.

Accolades

!
|-
|2020
|Power
| Best Adult Contemporary Album 
|
|

Track listing 

Notes

 "Baninzi" -  Guitars by Phonikz
 "Hamba" - Additional background vocals by Christer; Bass by Earl Breezy & Ishmail Ndlovu
 "Mmangwane" - Additional background vocals by Christer; Guitars by Given Zulu
 "Bayile" - Strings produced, arranged and directed by Kenneth Crouch and Performed by The Muses; Violin by Ashley Bodill & Olivia Kotze, Cello by Neo Buthelez; Strings engineered by George Vardas at CSR Studios, Johannesburg, South Africa
"Egoli" - Guitars by Given Zulu; Bass Guitar by Jody Willard
"Vuka" - Choir directed & produced by Milton Ndlakuse; Bass by Ishmail Ndhlovu; Drums by Kearabetswe "K-Beat" Moalusi
Afrika - Additional background vocals by Manana; Guitars by Given Zulu; Bass Guitar by Andziso; Horns by Adekunle Gold
"Love Again" - Guitars by Ryno Zeelie; Guitars engineered by Ryno Zeelie at Figure of 8 Studios, Johannesburg, South Africa
"Phambili" - Additional background vocals by Sjava & Christer
"Ndilinde" - Piano by Kenneth Crouch
"Thandwa Ndim" - Bass Guitars by Victory Chauke, Ishmail Ndhlovu & Zwelakhe Masemola; Guitars by Shadrack Fana
"Power" - Guitars by Phonikz & Andziso, Bass by Ishmail Ndhlovu, Organs by Kenneth Crouch

Sample credits 

 "Hamba" - Contains interpolation from "Hamba Bekhile (We Are Growing)" by Margaret Singana
 "Mmangwane" - Contains interpolation from "The Way Kungakhona" by Bongo Maffin
 "Bayile" - Contains interpolation from "Baile" by Pilani Bubu

Release history

References 

2019 albums
Amanda Black albums
Sony Music Associated Records singles